The United States House Committee on Post Office and Post Roads was a congressional committee which existed until 1946. A Select Committee on the Post Office and Post Roads was established in 1806 and made a standing committee in 1808 during the 10th Congress. The early membership of the committee consisted of one Member from each state.

The jurisdiction of the committee extended to all proposed legislation relating to the carrying of the mails, both foreign and domestic. It included the determination of the location, construction, and maintenance of post offices and post roads; the acquisition, lease, or transfer of realty or facilities for postal purposes; and certain aspects of the employment and management of postal employees, such as the pay and leave of letter carriers, and the settlement of claims brought by employees or contractors. It included the regulation of the Postal Service, including postal rates, the franking privilege, and the printing of stamped envelopes. At various times the Railway Mail Service, ocean mail service, pneumatic tube service, postal savings banks, postal telegraphy, the Air Mail Service, and Rural Free Delivery were included in its jurisdiction.

As part of its responsibility the committee investigated the management of postal facilities, contracts for carrying the mail, and other subjects such as the forgery of postal money orders.

In 1885 the jurisdiction of the committee was expanded to include appropriation authority. The committee prepared Post Office appropriations bills from that time until 1920 when the authority was revoked under a rule change. The committee functioned until 1946 (the 79th Congress) when its jurisdiction was included in that of the new House Committee on Post Office and Civil Service.

Chairmen

References

 

1806 establishments in the United States
1946 disestablishments in the United States
Post Office and Post Roads